Fighting Back is the debut studio album by the British heavy metal band Battlezone, a band that was formed by original ex-Iron Maiden vocalist Paul Di'Anno.

Track listing
All songs by John Hurley, except "(Forever) Fighting Back" by Bob Falck. Lyrics by Paul Di'Anno.

Side One
"(Forever) Fighting Back" - 2:20
"Welcome To The Battlezone" - 3:26
"Warchild" - 2:51
"In The Darkness" - 4:12
"The Land God Gave To Caine" - 7:19

Side Two
"Running Blind" - 4:46
"Too Much To Heart" - 4:45
"Voice on the Radio" - 3:09
"Welfare Warriors" - 4:39
"Feel The Rock" - 3:07

Personnel

Band members
Paul Di'Anno - lead vocals
John Hurley - guitar, backing vocals
John Wiggins - guitar, backing vocals
Pete West - bass
Bob Falck - drums, backing vocals

Additional musicians
Dave Montgomery - backing vocals

Production
Ian Richardson - producer, engineer

References

Paul Di'Anno albums
1986 debut albums

no:Di'Anno